St Senan's Church is a small Anglican Gothic Revival church located in Inniscarra, County Cork, Ireland. It is dedicated to Senán mac Geirrcinn, who is the patron saint of Inniscarra.

Along with the Church of Saint Peter in Carrigrohane and the Church of the Resurrection in Blarney, it is part of the Carrigrohane Union of Parishes in the Diocese of Cork, Cloyne, and Ross.

History 
The church was built to replace an earlier church nearby. This early church was built in the Early Georgian period, with a tower being added in 1756. It was abandoned after the construction of St Senan's, and is now a ruin. It sits on the site of a 6th-century church founded by St Senan.

St Senan's was built in 1819, at a cost of IR£923. The Board of First Fruits supplied the loan. It replaced an older church nearby, the ruins of which are still standing. The bell from the original church, which dates back to the 17th century, currently hangs in the new building.

Reverend George de la Poer Beresford was the first rector of the church. He was succeeded by his son, Reverend William Beresford, who was eventually stripped of his position by the Archbishop of Dublin and deported to Australia.

The interior was refitted by William Henry Hill in 1873. A chancel, also designed by Hill, was added to the building between 1892 and 1893.

In 1994, the 125-year-old organ from Christ Church, Magourney, was transferred to St Senan's after Christ Church was deconsecrated. The organ was restored to working order.

In 2012, the church was extended to include what is referred to as "the Glade".

Robert Ferris became the rector of the parish in 2020, having been Associate Minister there for eight years prior to his promotion.

Architecture 
St Senan's was designed by George Beale, and is built in the Gothic Revival style.

References

Notes

Sources 

 

Architecture in Ireland
Churches in the Diocese of Cork, Cloyne and Ross
19th-century Church of Ireland church buildings
Gothic Revival church buildings in the Republic of Ireland
19th-century churches in the Republic of Ireland